Ashibusa is a genus of moth in the family Cosmopterigidae.

Species
Ashibusa aculeata Z.W. Zhang & H.H. Li, 2009
Ashibusa clavativalvula Z.W. Zhang & H.H. Li, 2009
Ashibusa flavalba Z.W. Zhang & H.H. Li, 2009
Ashibusa jezoensis S. Matsumura, 1931
Ashibusa lativalvula Z.W. Zhang & H.H. Li, 2009
Ashibusa sinensis Z.W. Zhang & H.H. Li, 2009
Ashibusa subelliptica Z.W. Zhang & H.H. Li, 2009

References
Natural History Museum Lepidoptera genus database

Cosmopteriginae
Moth genera